Micklegate House is a Grade I listed building in York, a city in England.

The house lies on Micklegate, in the city centre.  It was completed by 1752, as a town house for John Bourchier of Beningbrough Hall.  It is often said to have been designed by John Carr, a local architect, as it is similar to other designs by him, although there is no firm evidence of this attribution.

Bourchier died in 1759, and the house passed to his wife.  When she died, in 1796, it was leased to James Walker, then to Joshua Crompton, who bought the freehold in 1815 and whose descendents lived in the property until 1896.  The house was then used as business premises, and many of the fittings were sold, most of the best being moved to Treasurer's House.

The house is the largest on the street, three stories high and seven bays wide.  The front is of red brick, with stone dressings, and the rear of pink brick.  Some original sash windows survive, as do a fireplace and bread oven on the second floor.  The hall retains rich decoration and a grand staircase to the first floor, and the dining room and library on the ground floor also retain some original fittings.

The house was listed in 1954, along with its railings and lamp brackets.  In 2015, it was converted into the Safestay hostel.

References

Grade I listed buildings in York
Houses completed in 1752
Houses in North Yorkshire
Micklegate